Dorothea Widmer (1758 - 1781), was a Swiss woman who was abused by her husband until she killed him.  Her crime attracted tremendous public attention in Switzerland.

Widmer's husband was an alcoholic who habitually abused her.  With her accomplice Bartholome Gubler, Widmer murdered him. 

Widmer and Gubler were both convicted of murder and sentenced to execution. After a postponement until her child was born, Widmer was executed on 29 August 1781 in Zürich.

Widmer attracted great public sympathy because of her youth, beauty and her longstanding abuse.  She was compared with Beatrice Cenci and became the subject of poems and inscriptions.

References 
 Johann Konrad Werdmüller-Ott: Kurze Darstellung der Merkwürdigkeiten des achtzehnten Jahrhunderts in unserem Vaterland. Bei Johann Caspar Näf, Zürich,1802, S.267

1758 births
1781 deaths
18th-century Swiss people
18th-century executions
18th-century Swiss women
Mariticides
People executed by Switzerland